KRRR (104.9 FM, 104.9 KRRR) is a radio station broadcasting a classic hits format. Licensed to Cheyenne, Wyoming, United States, the station is currently owned by Brahmin Broadcasting Corporation.

History
The station went on the air as KZCY on June 1, 1997.  On April 1, 2002, the station changed its call sign to the current KRRR.

Previous logo
 (KRRR's logo under previous oldies format)

References

External links

RRR
Radio stations established in 1997
Classic hits radio stations in the United States
1997 establishments in Wyoming